The men's team épée was one of seven fencing events on the Fencing at the 1924 Summer Olympics programme. It was the fourth appearance of the event.

The competition was held from Saturday July 6, 1924, to Tuesday July 9, 1924. 16 teams, composed of 88 fencers, competed.

Rosters

Each team could have up to eight members. Four were selected for each match.

Results

Round 1

The top two teams in each pool advanced. Each team played each other team in its pool, unless a match was unnecessary to determine qualification. Each team match included 16 bouts: four fencers from one team faced four fencers from the other team once apiece. Bouts were to two touches.

Pool A
The Spain vs. Norway match was tied on bouts, 8 to 8, and touches, 19 to 19, so was scored as a draw.

Pool B

Pool C

Pool D
Portugal received the top rank over the Netherlands on touches received, 56 to 60. Uruguay topped Denmark, 64 to 65.

Pool E

Quarterfinals

The top two teams in each pool advanced. Each team played each other team in its pool, unless a match was unnecessary to determine qualification. Each team match included 16 bouts: four fencers from one team faced four fencers from the other team once apiece. Bouts were to two touches.

Pool A

Pool B
The United States won the match against Switzerland on touches, 21 to 19.

Pool C

Semifinals

The top two teams in each pool advanced. Each team played each other team in its pool, unless the match was unnecessary to decide qualification. Each team match included 16 bouts: four fencers from one team faced four fencers from the other team once apiece. Bouts were to two touches.

Pool A
France was ahead of Portugal on touches received in the standings, 15 to 17.

Pool B

Final

Each team played each other team. Each team match included 16 bouts: four fencers from one team faced four fencers from the other team once apiece. Bouts were to two touches. France won its bout against Italy on touches, 21 to 20.

References

 
 

Epee men team
Men's events at the 1924 Summer Olympics